Centre for European Studies is the name of several organisations involved in the field of European studies:

 The Minda de Gunzburg Center for European Studies, at Harvard University
 The Centre for European Studies (think tank), the official foundation of the European People's Party
 The Centre for European Studies, at Aberystwyth University
 The Centre for European Studies, at Bifröst University, Iceland
 The Centre for European Studies, at Chulalongkorn University, Bangkok, Thailand
 The Centre for European Studies, at University of Salerno, Italy
 The Centre for European Studies of University College London
 The Manipal Centre for European Studies of Manipal University, in Karnataka, India
 The College of Europe, Bruges, Belgium
 Centre d'études européennes de Strasbourg (Center for European Studies, CEES) of the University of Strasbourg
 Centro Studi d'Europa (Europe Study Centre), Rome, Italy

Centre for European Studies may also refer to:

 The Centre for European  Policy Studies, a think tank based in Brussels, Belgium 
 The Research Centre for East European Studies of the University of Bremen
 The Institute of European Studies of the Jagiellonian University